Pleuropholidae is an extinct family of stem-teleost fish that lived from the Middle Jurassic to the Early Cretaceous. It is one of several families that were historically placed in the paraphyletic order Pholidophoriformes. Pleuropholids can be distinguished from other "pholidophoriforms" by the elongated scales on the sides of their bodies.

Taxonomy 
The family has five genera:
 Austropleuropholis
 Gondwanapleuropholis
 Parapleuropholis
 Pleuropholis
 Zurupleuropholis

References 

Prehistoric ray-finned fish families
Middle Jurassic first appearances
Early Cretaceous extinctions